Wrestling  is the sports to be contested at the 2019 South Asian Games. Wrestling  will be hosted at the Janakpur Covered Hall, in Janakpur, Nepal from 6 to 9 December 2019.

References

2019 South Asian Games
Events at the 2019 South Asian Games
Wrestling at the South Asian Games